Heart on Fire is the name of one of Ruslana's new songs.
It was performed at the opening of the Eurovision Song Contest 2005.

External links
 Eurovision 2005 Opening Sequence (Ruslana performing Heart on Fire live)

Ruslana songs
2008 songs
Songs written by Ruslana